Reduced cream is a New Zealand canned dairy product.

It was originally sold by Nestlé, but other companies in New Zealand have created their own reduced cream products. Typical ingredients are skimmed milk, cream, and thickener 401 (sodium alginate).

It is offered as a low-fat alternative to cream, with Nestlé claiming theirs has "38% less fat than thickened cream". Reduced cream does not require refrigeration.

Use
Reduced cream is used to make Kiwi onion dip, along with Maggi-brand instant onion soup (another Nestlé brand). The recipe was developed by Rosemary Dempsey in the late 1950s or early 1960s at Nestlé's newly established test kitchen in Auckland.

References

External links
 Nestlé New Zealand site for Reduced cream

Nestlé brands
Food and drink in New Zealand